WGON-LP (103.7 FM) is a radio station licensed to serve the community of Slidell, Louisiana. The station is owned by First Pentecostal Church of Slidell. It airs a religious format.

The station was assigned the WGON-LP call letters by the Federal Communications Commission on February 22, 2002.

References

External links
 Official Website
 

Low-power FM radio stations in Louisiana
Radio stations established in 2003
2003 establishments in Louisiana
St. Tammany Parish, Louisiana
Christian radio stations in Louisiana